Qarawat Bani Hassan is a Palestinian town in the Salfit Governorate of the State of Palestine, located thirty kilometers southwest of Nablus and 8 kilometers northwest of Salfit in the northern West Bank. According to the Palestinian Central Bureau of Statistics, the town had a population of 3,801 in 2007.

Its total land area is 9,684 dunams, of which 507 dunams is built-up area. Since the 1995 Interim Agreement on the West Bank and the Gaza Strip, 10.7% of its municipal jurisdiction is under the civil administration of the Palestinian National Authority and the security of Israel, while 89.2% is under complete Israeli control.

Location
It is bordered by Deir Istiya and Haris to the east, Sarta to the south, Biddya to the west, and Deir Istiya to the north.

Archaeology
Potsherds from the   Iron Age II,   Iron Age II/Persian, Byzantine, Byzantine/Umayyad, Umayyad/Abbasid, Crusader/Ayyubid and Mamluk era have been found.
Qarawat Bani Hassan was examined in 1873, and several major remains were found, some of possible Byzantine origin.

Deir ed-Derb
  

About 1/2 mile SE of the village centre is Deir ed Derb ("The monastery of the road"), described as "one of the finest sepulchral monuments in the country". In 1873 when it was visited, it was described as having three chambers. The portico had a 50 ft long Doric cornice in front, and was supported by two Ionic columns and two pilasters. 15 triglyphs and 14 rosettes were cut, where all the rosettes were of different designs. It looked as if the work was not quite finished, as not all the gutta had been carved. The walls of the portico are carved to resemble irregular drafted masonry.
The structure bears a strong resemblance to some tombs by Jerusalem, which have been dated to 1st century CE.

Kulat Ferdus
Kulat Ferdus is a tower, situated in the middle of the village, and named after a king whose tomb is to the south (beside Deir ed Derb). In 1873 it was described as being inhabited, and in very good condition. The size was 40 times 45 feet, and 20 to 30 feet heigh. The outer walls were 5 feet thick, and 1 1/2 to 5 feet long. The courses were from 1 foot 8 inches to 2 feet tall. The stones were drafted, cut 4 inches broad and 1 inch deep.
The building was entered through two doors on the east side. There were six chambers inside, about 6 times 12 feet in size and with a semicircular vaulting. The building appeared of Byzantine origin, possibly earlier.

Burj el-Yakhur
Burj el-Yakhur is a two-story tower, located in the upper part of the village, to the south. The walls are 6–8 feet thick. The ground floor (basement) is about 48 times 24 feet, 12–15 feet high, and has a fine barrel vault. To the left of the entrance, there is a stair leading up to the first floor. According to Pringle, this tower dates from the Crusader area.

Sheikh 'Aly el-Amanat
An above average sized mosque located at the south-east end of the village. When examined in 1873, a large sunken structure was found adjoining it on the western side. Part of this structure was used as a birkeh ("pool"). According to Pringle, this mosque (called Jami al-Umari), dates from the Mamluk area.

History
Amr ibn al-A'as, a prominent Arab commander of the Rashidun army, was said to have been injured in the village. According to local tradition, a tree was planted on the spot where his blood was spilled. The story was written up in the village history in the year 1919. In 1225 Arab geographer Yaqut al-Hamawi noted that Qarawat Bani Hassan was "a village in the District of Nablus."

Ottoman era
In 1596, Qarawat Bani Hasan appeared in Ottoman tax registers as being in the nahiya of Jabal Qubal, part of the Sanjak of Nablus. It had a population of 13 households and 3 bachelors, all Muslim. The villagers paid a fixed tax rate of 33,3% on various products, such as wheat, barley, summer crops, olive trees, goats and beehives, in addition to "occasional revenues"; a total of 2,000 akçe. Potsherds from the early Ottoman era have been found.

In 1838 Kurawa Beni Hasan was noted as a Muslim village, in Jurat Merda, south of Nablus.

French explorer Victor Guérin visited the village in 1870, and estimated it as having about 150 inhabitants. He described the town as being in decline, but with great remains of former better times. When he was visiting, a squad of bashi-bazouks were rounding up 35 villagers, and taking them to Nablus as they had not paid their taxes. In the 1882 "Survey of Western Palestine", the village (called Kurawa Ibn Hasan) was described as: partly ruinous, but evidently at one time a place of great importance, with ancient tombs, one of great beauty, and rude stone towers. Its ancient name is given by the natives as Sham et Tawil. The little mosque of Sheikh 'Aly el 'Amanat stands apparendy over the apse of a church. The supply of water is from wells and cisterns.

British Mandate era
In the 1922 census of Palestine conducted in 1922 by the British Mandate authorities, Karawa or Qarawa had an entirely Muslim population of 313, while in the 1931 census, Qarawa had 89 occupied houses and population of 352, still all Muslim.

In the 1945 statistics    the population was 450, all Muslims, while the total land area was 9,685 dunams, according to an official land and population survey. Of this, 105 were allocated for plantations and irrigable land, 2,820 for cereals, while 30 dunams were classified as built-up areas.

Jordanian era
In the wake of the 1948 Arab–Israeli War, and after the 1949 Armistice Agreements, Qarawat Bani Hassan came under Jordanian rule.

The Jordanian census of 1961 found 667 inhabitants.

Post-1967
Since the Six-Day War in 1967, Qarawat Bani Hassan has been under Israeli occupation.

In 1986, the Israeli settlement of Kiryat Netafim was founded on land belonging to the Palestinian villages of Qarawat Bani Hassan and Haris. In November 2014 Netafim began bulldozing and clearing further Qarawat Bani Hassan territory, under the protecting of Israeli troops, in a measure apparently designed to extend the settlement.

After the 1995 accords, 9% of village land was classified as Area B in the Oslo II Accord, while the remaining 91% is Area C.

Israel has confiscated a total of 341 dunams from Qarawat Bani Hassan: 174 dunams for Kiryat Netafim and 167 dunams for Barkan.

Demographics
In the 1997 census by the Palestinian Central Bureau of Statistics (PCBS), Qarawat Bani Hassan had a population of 2,703. The overwhelming majority of the population were original inhabitants, with no significant refugee population.
According to the Palestinian Central Bureau of Statistics, Qarawat Bani Hassan had a population of 3,801 in the 2007 census. The gender ratio was 52.7% male and 47.3% female. There were a total 669 households and the average household had between 5-6 members.

Economy
Prior to the Second Intifada, about 50% of the Qarawat Bani Hassan's residents of working age were employed. About 40% worked in Israel and 10% in other work inside the village. Today, 10% of the working population worked in agriculture, 10% in Israeli settlements, and 10% as traders and store merchants.

Primary agricultural products include olives, wheat, almonds, figs. Olive oil is the main product and the village produces an average of 102,000 litres of oil per year. Its inhabitants mostly export to Jordan.

Freedom Road
In 2010 the Prime Minister of the Palestinian National Authority Salam Fayyad visited Qarawat Bani Hassan and was told about the lack of a paved road between the village and its land. After that, the PA granted funds and the road, named "Freedom Road", was built. It was located in Area C. However, because the road was not built with Israeli approval (all construction in Area C must be coordinated with Israel), it was subsequently torn up by the Israelis in late 2010. The road was repaired by the Palestinians, but on 24 March 2011 again torn up by the Israelis.

Government
Qarawat Bani Hassan is governed by a village council of nine members. Each three members represent one of the three families of the village: 'Asi, Mar'ai and Rayan. Local elections do not take place, but family heads select their representatives. Israel is in charge of security affairs and the Palestinian National Authority is responsible for civil affairs of the village. However, agricultural land is under the complete control of Israel.

Springs
According to a 2012 UN report two springs belonging to the village, Ein Al Majur and Ein El Nwetef, are at risk of being taken over by settlers from the nearby illegal Israeli settlement of Havat Yair.

References

Bibliography

External links
Welcome To Qarawat Bani Hasan
Survey of Western Palestine, Map 14:    IAA, Wikimedia commons 
Qarawat Bani Hassan Town (Fact Sheet), Applied Research Institute–Jerusalem (ARIJ)
Qarawat Bani Hassan Town Profile, ARIJ
Qarawat Bani Hassan real photo, ARIJ
   Road Infrastructure for settlement linkage and expansion, 24, February, 2006, POICA
House demolition warnings in Qarawat Bani Hassan – Qalqiliya 11, April, 2007, POICA
New House Demolitions Threats in Qarawat Bani Hassan village 05, August, 2007, POICA
A house demolished in Qarawet Bani Hassan village 26, August, 2007, POICA
 6 Eviction Orders in Qarawat bani Hassan- Salfit Governoarte, 13, December, 2011, POICA
Qarawat Bani Hassan Village Profile, 2009 
Qarawat Bani Hassan
Qarrawat Bani Hassan, ISM
 Qarawat Bani Hassan, ISM

Towns in Salfit Governorate
Salfit Governorate
Municipalities of West Bank
Municipalities of the State of Palestine